Anti-Western sentiment has been increasing in China since the early 1990s, particularly amongst Chinese young adults. Notable incidents which have resulted in a significant anti-Western backlash have included the 1999 NATO bombing of the Chinese embassy in Belgrade, the 2008 demonstrations during the Olympic torch relay and alleged Western media bias, especially in relation to the March 2008 Tibet riots.

While available public opinion polls show that the Chinese hold generally favorable views towards the United States, there remains suspicion over the West's motives towards China stemming largely from historical experiences and specifically the 'century of humiliation'. Some allege that these suspicions have been increased by the Chinese Communist Party's Patriotic Education Campaign. The reliability of public opinion polls of the Chinese population has also been questioned due to the 'political culture' in China, which may lead to respondents giving socially acceptable answers.

Background

Qing dynasty
Anti-Western sentiment manifested itself in the First and Second Opium Wars as well as the Boxer Rebellion when the Righteous Harmony Society attacked westerners, missionaries and converted Chinese Christians. The Qing dynasty was divided between anti-Westerners, moderates and reformists. A Manchu prince, Zaiyi, and a Chinese general Dong Fuxiang who led 10,000 Muslim Kansu Braves attacked foreigners and defeated them at the Battle of Langfang during the rebellion.

Muslims
Hatred of foreigners from high ranking Chinese Muslim officers stemmed from the way foreigners handled Chinese affairs, rather than for religious reasons, the same reason other non-Muslim Chinese hated foreigners. Promotion and wealth were other motives among Chinese Muslim military officers for anti foreignism.

Kuomintang anti-Westernism
Some members of the Kuomintang party held anti-Western sentiments. Kuomintang Muslim General Bai Chongxi led a wave of anti foreignism in Guangxi, attacking American, European, and other foreigners and missionaries, and generally making the province unsafe for foreigners. Westerners fled from the province, and some Chinese Christians were also attacked as imperialist agents. Westerners were attacked in the streets, with many of them fleeing to their respective consulates. The three goals of his movement were anti-foreignism, anti-imperialism, and anti-religion.

As a Kuomintang member, Bai and the other Guangxi clique members allowed the Communists to continue attacking foreigners and smash idols, since they shared the goal of expelling the foreign powers from China, but they stopped Communists from initiating social change.

General Bai also wanted to aggressively expel foreign powers from other areas of China. Bai gave a public speech in which he claimed that the ethnic minorities of China were suffering under "foreign oppression". Bai called upon the Chinese government and the people of China to assist them in expelling the foreigners from those lands. He personally wanted to lead an expedition to seize back Xinjiang to bring it under Chinese control, in the style that Zuo Zongtang led during the Dungan revolt. It is important to note that Bai Chongxi was a Hui himself.

The Blue Shirts Society, a fascist paramilitary organization within the Kuomintang modeled after Mussolini's blackshirts, was anti foreign and anti communist, and stated that its agenda was to expel foreign (Japanese and Western) Imperialists from China, crush communism, and eliminate feudalism. In addition to being anti Communist, some Kuomintang members, like Chiang Kaishek's right-hand man Dai Li were anti-American, and they wanted to expel American influence.

History
The causes of anti-Western sentiment in China include the collective memory of the period of Chinese history beginning with the two Opium Wars between 18391860 and ending with the expulsion of the Japanese after the Second World War which is known to the Chinese as the century of humiliation when China was sacked by a western coalition. Wang Zheng wrote that it was "attacked, bullied, and torn asunder by imperialists". Kenneth Lieberthal, a political science professor at the University of Michigan, has argued that the demonstrations in Western cities during the Olympic torch relay had "deep historical resonance" amongst Chinese, who suspect that after China's recovery from its fall in international stature from 150 years ago, "the West is trying to humiliate them again". Supporting this view, a 2007 survey found that 45% of the Chinese general public believed that the U.S. was "trying to prevent China from becoming a great power" compared to 32% who believed that the U.S. accepted "China's status as a rising power", 23% were "not sure". Although this sentiment has been partially assuaged by the return to China of Hong Kong and of Macau, the unresolved political status of Taiwan remains for some a reminder of China's weakness and division.

James Kelly, former US assistant secretary for East Asian and Pacific Affairs, has noted that nationalistic sentiments and anger over the torch protests was more concentrated amongst Chinese under the age of 30. Suisheng Zhao and Kenneth B. Pyle argue that a shift in Chinese education policy that these young adults experienced is partly responsible for their increased nationalism. Zheng Wang argues that by the 1990s the international situation had reduced the appeal of Communism as a legitimizing ideology for China's rulers. As a result, the leadership reversed many of the Chinese Communist Party's changes to Chinese historiography from 1949 that interpreted Chinese history as a history of class struggle. Announced in 1991 and fully functioning by 1994, this "Patriotic Education Campaign" reinterpreted history in national terms, rehabilitating figures like General Tso who suppressed a peasant rebellion but stemmed a Russian invasion of Xinjiang, and acknowledging the role of Chinese nationalist (rather than just communist) fighters in the Second Sino-Japanese War. Students find personal resonance more in such narratives than in previous classes about Marxist doctrine because they hear about the atrocities against China not just from history textbooks but from their parents and grandparents.

From 1999

1999 NATO bombing of the Chinese embassy in Belgrade 

On 7 May 1999, during Operation Allied Force, NATO aircraft bombed the Chinese embassy in Belgrade, killing three Chinese citizens. The US claimed that the bombing was an accident caused by the use of outdated maps but few Chinese accepted this explanation. The incident caused widespread anger and following the attack Chinese officials described the bombing as a "barbarian act" and a "war crime" while Chinese students in Europe and America demonstrated against 'NATO fascism'.

In China, thousands were involved in protest marches in Beijing and other provincial capitals, some protesters threw gas bombs and rocks at the diplomatic missions of the United States and other NATO countries while in Chengdu the American Consul's residence was firebombed.

2008 Beijing Olympics torch relay protests 

Prior to the 2008 Summer Olympic Games to be held in Beijing, the international leg of the Olympic torch relay was subject to widespread demonstrations primarily over "China's human rights record and Tibetan independence." In London, thirty-seven arrests were made when protestors clashed with police as the torch made its way through the city while in Paris the relay was cut short and the torch transported by bus after protestors disrupted the procession.

Protests also took place in Athens, Istanbul, Buenos Aires, Bangkok, Canberra, Nagano, and Seoul. In response, Chinese government officials condemned the protests and overseas Chinese organised 'pro-China' counter-demonstrations at torch processions, joined by counter-protests in many Chinese cities.

Despite the protests being aimed at specific issues raised through western media, Chinese state media sources, such as CCTV, referred to the protestors as being 'anti-Chinese'. In one instance, Chinese state-run news source China Daily reported that "[a]ll the recent protests against the 2008 Olympic torch relay are not against Chinese government, as some protesters repeated. They are against all of the ordinary Chinese people living everywhere in the world".

Chinese activists organised protests outside Carrefour stores in at least 10 Chinese cities and called on shoppers to boycott the French retailer following protests in Paris. Messages distributed via the internet and mobile phones had accused the company of supporting the Dalai Lama, a claim denied by Carrefour CEO Jose-Luis Duran.

Media bias 

Chinese netizens in both China and overseas have accused Western media sources of giving dishonest reports about riots in Tibet in March 2008. An article by the state-run China Daily reports that several Chinese activists accused, with substantiation, several Western media sources of misreporting and distorting the incident to tarnish China's image. Chinese sources opined on the matter, arguing that Western media reports of the Tibet violence had displayed "ignorance and prejudice", that the reporting of China more generally was "with few exceptions, only stories about censorship, spoiled food products, human rights issues, dangerous toys and the like... are published", and "stoking the young people's repulsion to the West and in turn aroused the patriotic passion of the young people". Several websites were created to challenge the Western media's reporting of China, including anti-cnn.com, whose founder Rao Jin described Western media reporting as "white supremacy".

In addition, the Chinese government has weighed in on the issue of media bias. Fu Ying, the Chinese Ambassador to the United Kingdom wrote that the Western media had attempted to 'demonise' China while in April 2008, the Chinese Foreign Ministry demanded an apology from CNN after news commentator Jack Cafferty referred to the Chinese as a "bunch of goons and thugs" for which CNN subsequently apologized.

James Kelly has argued that China's media censorship itself may be a major factor in fostering anti-Western sentiment, claiming that China's media gives a "very one-sided" view of the West.

Tibetan independence 

On 2 March 2009 the Information Office of the State Council of the People's Republic of China published a white paper entitled: "Fifty Years of Democratic Reform in Tibet". In the paper the defeat of a Tibetan rebellion in 1959 is likened to the American civil war, arguing that China's abolition of Tibetan feudal serfdom was "entirely comparable to the emancipation of the slaves in the American civil war." The white paper goes on to argue that by supporting the 14th Dalai Lama "Western anti-China forces" were guilty of ignoring historical facts regarding Tibet and that:

"It is thus clear that the so-called "Tibet issue" is by no means an ethnic, religious and human rights issue; rather, it is the Western anti-China forces' attempt to restrain, split, and demonize China."

Cyber attacks 

Following CNN's allegedly biased reporting regarding the March 2008 unrest in Tibet, CNN's website was hacked and replaced with a page proclaiming that "Tibet WAS, IS, and ALWAYS WILL BE a part of China". According to a report by Nick Lazaredes for Journeyman Pictures "patriotic hacking" by Chinese nationalists is on the rise and Western security experts estimate that there are up to 300,000 Chinese hackers ready to "wage a cyber-war."

Surveys of public opinion about the US

In 2008, a report was prepared by the Committee of 100 with the assistance of Zogby International and the Horizon Research Consultancy Group. Entitled "Hope and Fear" the report outlined the results of opinion polls regarding Chinese and American attitudes towards each other. The report found that while a significant proportion of the Chinese general public believe that the Western media portrays China inaccurately, Chinese people generally hold favourable views of the U.S. and report themselves as being less 'highly patriotic' than Americans, as shown in the tables below:

See also

 Anti-American sentiment in China
 Anti-Japanese sentiment in China
 Anti-Korean sentiment in China
 Racism in China
 Sinophobia

References

Further reading

External links

Foreign relations of China
China